Comino is a small island of the Maltese archipelago between the islands of Malta and Gozo in the Mediterranean Sea, measuring  in area. Named after the cumin seed, the island has a permanent population of only two residents and is part of the municipality of Għajnsielem, in southeastern Gozo, from where one priest and one policeman commute. The island is a bird sanctuary and nature reserve (Natura 2000 Marine Protected area).

Environment 

The island has a karst landscape supporting sclerophyllous shrubland. Some limited afforestation with pine trees has been carried out. The sand-dunes at Santa Maria bay retain some native vegetation, including Vitex and Tamarix trees. The island has been identified as an Important Bird Area (IBA) by BirdLife International because it supports fifty to eighty breeding pairs of yelkouan shearwaters.

History
Formerly called Ephaestia (Ηφαιστεία in Ancient Greek), Comino is known to have been inhabited by farmers during Roman times, but for long periods in its history it has been sparsely populated, privately owned, or abandoned entirely. Its rugged coastline is delineated by sheer limestone cliffs, and dotted with deep caves which were popular with pirates and marauders in the Middle Ages. The caves and coves of Comino were frequently used as staging posts for raids on hapless boats crossing between Malta and Gozo. From 1285 until some time after 1290, Comino was the home of exiled Jewish prophet and Kabbalist Abraham Abulafia. It was on Comino that Abulafia composed his Sefer ha-Ot (The Book of the Sign), and his last work, Imre Shefer (Words of Beauty).

In later years, the Knights of Malta used this island as hunting and recreational grounds.  The Knights were fiercely protective of the local game, which consisted of wild boar and hares (Maltese: fenek tal-grixti): upon conviction, poachers were liable to a penalty of three years as a galley slave. In the 16th and 17th centuries, Comino served as a place of imprisonment or exile for errant knights. Knights who were convicted of minor crimes were occasionally sentenced to the lonely and dangerous task of manning St. Mary's Tower.

During the French occupation of Malta, Comino served as a quarantine and existing buildings served as an isolation hospital. The island served as a temporary prison site before a decision on the accused is taken.

On 6 March 1889 the British battleship HMS Sultan grounded on an uncharted rock in the Comino Channel, ripping her bottom open. She slowly flooded and, in a gale on 14 March 1889 she slipped off the rock and sank. The Italian firm of Baghino & Co raised her in August 1889 for a fee of £50,000. On 27 August, Sultan was brought into Malta.

Named after the cumin seed that once flourished in the Maltese islands, the island is the least densely populated area in the Republic of Malta. It has a permanent population of only two residents, following the deaths of two other residents in 2017 and 2020.

Buildings and structures

St Mary's Tower

Saint Mary's Tower is the most visible structure on the island.  Its background dates back to 1416, when the Maltese petitioned their king, Alfonso V of Aragon, to build a tower on Comino to serve as an early warning system in case of invasion, and to deter marauding Turks, pirates, smugglers and corsairs from using Comino as a hiding place and staging ground for devastating sorties onto the sister islands of Malta and Gozo.  Two years later the king levied a special tax on imported wine to raise funds for this project, but diverted the monies into his coffers; the island remained undefended for another two hundred years.

Finally, in 1618 the Knights of Malta under Grandmaster Wignacourt erected St Mary's Tower (Maltese: it-Torri ta' Santa Marija), located roughly in the center of the southern coast of the island. The tower formed part of a chain of defensive towers — the Wignacourt, Lascaris, and De Redin towers — located at vantage points along the coastline of the Maltese Islands, and greatly improved communications between Malta and Gozo.

During the French Blockade (1798–1800), St Mary's Tower served as a prison for suspected spies. In 1829 the British Military abandoned the site. For several decades it was deemed to be property of the local civil authorities, and may have been used as an isolation hospital, or even as a wintering pen for farm animals. The tower again saw active service during both World War I and World War II. Since 1982 the tower has been the property of the Armed Forces of Malta. It now serves as a lookout and staging post to guard against contraband and the illegal hunting of migratory birds at sea. The tower underwent extensive restoration between 2002 and 2004. Today, it remains the most notable structure on Comino.

Comino chapel

A chapel dedicated to the Assumption of St Mary existed in the proximity of the Bay of St Mary since at least 1296. Indeed, it was this chapel which gave the bay its name and not opposite.

A Roman Catholic chapel dedicated to the Holy Family Upon its Return from Egypt is located above Santa Marija Bay. Built in 1618, and enlarged in 1667 and again in 1716, the chapel was originally dedicated to the Annunciation. It has been deconsecrated and reconsecrated at least once in its history, when Comino was devoid of residents. The earliest record of a chapel on this site dates back to the 12th century, and can be seen in a navigational map of the period, located in the National Maritime Museum and Royal Observatory in Greenwich, London.

In the past, and well into the 20th century, whenever the seas were too rough for the Gozitan priest to make the crossing to Comino for the celebration of Holy Mass, the local community would gather on the rocks at a part of the Island known as Tal-Ħmara, and gaze across the channel towards the Chapel of Our Lady of the Rocks (Maltese: il-Madonna tal-Blat), in Ħondoq ir-Rummien, Gozo, where Mass was being celebrated. They followed along with the progression of the Mass by means of a complex flag code.

Saint Mary's Battery and Redoubt

Saint Mary's Battery, built in 1716, at the same time as various other batteries around the coastline of mainland Malta and Gozo, is situated facing the South Comino Channel. It is a semi-circular structure with a number of embrasures facing the sea. The Battery still houses two 24-pound iron cannon, and remains in a fair state of preservation mainly due to its remote location. Its armament originally included four 6-pound iron cannon. The Battery underwent restoration in 1996 by Din l-Art Ħelwa. Saint Mary's Redoubt, an additional defensive structure, was also constructed in 1716 on the northern coast of Comino, however it was subsequently demolished. The Knights also constructed army barracks on Comino. In the early 20th century the barracks were periodically used as an isolation hospital.

Contemporary structures 

The Comino Hotel was built in the 1960s above San Niklaw Bay. There are also holiday bungalows by the Santa Marija Bay. The hotel is being rebuilt by Hili Ventures Ltd (run by Melo Hili) with an investment of €120m and set to be completed in 2023. The project is for the 100-room Comino Hotel to be demolished and replaced by a 70-room hotel and 19 bungalows. The environmental impact assessment of the project noted the negative impact of extraction of rock and soil from the site, and the loss of habitat in both sites due to the change in location and the increased number of building, further encroaching on the surrounding garrigue. The project has yet to receive full planning and environmental permission. Hotel and bungalow village are expected to open by 2025.

The Comino Police Station is located between the bungalows and the Comino Chapel. It is responsible for the small community and visitors, aided by the Malta Police Force in Malta and Gozo when necessary.

Crystal Lagoon 
The lesser-known Crystal Lagoon is located near the world-famous Blue Lagoon in the west of Comino. It features turquoise waters, impressive cliffs, caves, and crystal clear water. A must-visit for anyone looking to experience true relaxation & beauty!. Snorkeling, swimming or cliff diving at the Crystal Lagoon can be a wonderful experience. You'll find plenty of small fish and other marine life while snorkling in this amazing place. The best way to get there is through a boat hire excursion as there is no ferrys to Crystal Lagoon. Another possibility is to get a ferry to Blue Lagoon and walk 20 minutes south along the coast to Crystal Lagoon.

Transport 
Ferries provide transportation to Comino from either Malta or Gozo, with scheduled boat trips departing from Cirkewwa or Mġarr. Schedules vary by season. Providers offer boat taxi service from Blue Lagoon, Comino back to the mainlines as well as tours of the Santa Maria Caves in Comino.

Economy

Impact of tourism 
Between Comino and adjacent islet of Cominotto (Maltese: Kemmunett) lie the transparent, cyan waters of the Blue Lagoon (Maltese: Bejn il-Kmiemen, literally "Between the Cominos"). Frequented by large numbers of tourists and tour boats daily, the Blue Lagoon is a picturesque bay with a white sandy base and rich marine life. It is popular with divers, snorkelers and swimmers. Other beaches on Comino include Santa Maria Bay (Maltese: Ramla ta' Santa Marija) and St. Nicholas Bay (Maltese: Bajja San Niklaw).

The touristic over-exploitation of Comino, and in particular of the Blue Lagoon, became a matter of contention in the late 2010s. Despite regulations, at least seven illegal kiosks have sprung up on the coastline; none of them has a permit from the Malta Tourism Authority, and they are permanently parked on the spot, while they should be left on wheels and removed every day. Operators have also started deploying deckchairs and umbrellas in the Blue Lagoon sandy beach as early as 7 AM, filling up all public space. Cruise liners bringing hundreds of tourists on the spot are leading to a strong environmental impact (with loud music and trash left on the spot, attracting rats) and creeping privatisation of the former natural hotspot, while providing no upkeep of the bay. 

Commercial interests and political connections have fostered the touristic exploitation of Comino. The deck-chair rentals at the Blue Lagoon are owned by Daniel Refalo, an associate of construction tycoon Joseph Portelli, and by Mark Cutajar, brother of Labour MEP Josianne Cutajar and former canvasser for Gozo Minister Clint Camilleri in 2022, are the two individuals who own the deckchair rental operations on Comino’s Blue Lagoon. Back in 2016, Refalo and Cutajar claimed that they were being scapegoated, and that "the chaos that now exists in the Blue Lagoon... is part of a larger and deeper problem facing Maltese tourism". Pleasure and Leisure Ltd, one of the companies running daily ferries to Comino under the brand Oh Yeah Malta, is owned by the father and uncles of Tourism Minister Clayton Bartolo from nearby Mellieħa. One of the kiosks, tal-Ekxa, is run by Victor Refalo, a former Labour local councillor from Żebbuġ, Gozo and canvasser of Gozo Minister Clint Camilleri.

In early 2021, with the pretext of emergency procedures to prevent the road from caving in, the Gozo Ministry conducted illegal works to install a service culverts with manholes to pass utility services along the dirt road to the Blue Lagoon. According to the ministry, the culvert would eliminate the use of electricity generators, while denying that fixed kiosks were being planned for Blue Lagoon. Environmental activists including Friends of the Earth Malta noted that the works, later greenlighted by the Environment Resources Authority, had an impact on the natural surroundings, with excavation on trenches and widening of the track, and accused the authorities to attempt to legitimise illegal commercial activity. The works were welcomed by the illegal kiosk owners, including Refalo. The Labour Party organising secretary, architect William Lewis, also applied to install a wooden walkway over the garrigue terrain leading to the kiosks and the Blue Lagoon; a permit is pending.

Malta's Moviment Graffitti has denounced the over-development and touristification, also conducting direct actions to remove the illegal deck-chairs and umbrellas in June and August 2022. Graffitti called for a master plan for Comino that would limit activity on the island as well as set defined areas for operators.

Cinema industry 
Comino is a popular location for filmmakers. It appears in the feature films Troy, The Count of Monte Cristo (in which St. Mary's Tower is featured as the prison fortress Château d'If) and Swept Away.

References

Further reading
 Bartolo, Evarist (2013). X' taf fuq Kemuna?. Għaqda Mużikali Imperial [Imperial Band Club Magazine]. pp. 138–139. Retrieved 19 July 2016.
 HMS Sultan disaster
 Gossett, William Patrick (1986). The Lost Ships of the Royal Navy, 1793–1900. (London: Mansell). .

External links 

 Gozo Comino Ferry
 Dive sites in Comino
 Comino – Travel guide on MaltaUncovered.com
 Comino, the Comino Caves & St. Mary's Tower – Photos on UnitedCominoFerries.com

 
Għajnsielem
Important Bird Areas of Malta
Islands of Malta